The Fund for Assistance to Private Education (FAPE) is a perpetual trust fund for private education created by E.O. 156 S. 1968 and amended by E.O. 150 S. 1994.

FAPE was created on November 5, 1968 by Executive Order No. 156, in implementation of the project agreement between the Philippine and United States governments to establish a permanent trust fund that would address the needs of the private education sector in the country.

In the 1960s, the Coordinating Council of Private Educational Associations, or COCOPEA, campaigned for a share in the Special Education Fund, which was from the surplus funds authorized by the War Damage Act of 1962. The private education sector successfully convinced the Philippine government that it has an important role to play in nation-building such that it not only deserved but also needed to be assisted financially.

The trustee of FAPE is the Private Education Assistance Committee (PEAC), which is headed by the Secretary of Education as its chairman. PEAC is also composed of representatives from the National Economic Development Authority (NEDA); Catholic Educational Association of the Philippines (CEAP); Association of Christian Schools, Colleges, and Universities (ACSCU); and the Philippine Association of Colleges and Universities (PACU).

Through the years, the management of the Fund has evolved to cover other programs of assistance to the private education sector and with it an organization that helps the PEAC. Recently renamed the PEAC National Secretariat (so as not to confuse with the trust fund), the organization, as directed by the PEAC, manages and develops programs of assistance to private education and participates in initiatives affecting the sector. Presently, it manages the Education Service Contracting, Teacher Salary Subsidy, and Senior High School Voucher Program components of the GASTPE Program of the Department of Education, the In-Service Training Program, and the Research Program, among others.

References 
 PEAC Website

External links 
 PEAC Website

Private education in the Philippines
Non-profit organizations based in the Philippines
Organizations established in 1968
1968 establishments in the Philippines